Adnur is a village in the southern state of Karnataka, India. It is located in the Navalgund taluk of Dharwad district.

Demographics
As of the 2011 Census of India there were 207 households in Adnur and a total population of 1,025 consisting of 539 males and 486 females. There were 99 children ages 0-6.

See also
 Dharwad
 Districts of Karnataka

References

External links
 http://Dharwad.nic.in/

Villages in Dharwad district